Killer Joe is an album by Benny Golson recorded in 1977 and released by the Columbia label. This was Golson's first jazz album in over a decade when his career has been devoted to writing music for television and motion pictures.

Reception 

The Allmusic review states, "This album broke Golson's long hiatus in America and reintroduced him to the domestic jazz audience, but it wasn't quite the hit for him as for Quincy Jones".

Track listing
All compositions by Benny Golson except where noted
 "Hesitation" (Richard Stekol) – 4:18
 "Walkin' and Stalkin'" – 5:06
 "Love Uprising" (Charles Collins, Bobby Martin, Dennis Harris, Michael Foreman) – 3:54
 "The New Killer Joe Rap" (Benny Golson, Bobbie Golson) – 2:34
 "The New Killer Joe" (Golson, Quincy Jones) – 5:38
 "I'll Do It All With You" – 5:35
 "Easy All Day Long" (Golson, Martin) – 6:30
 "Timbale Rock" – 6:35
 "Tomorrow Paradise" – 2:01

Personnel 
 Benny Golson - arranger, tenor saxophone, soprano saxophone, piano, Fender Rhodes, humming, vibraphone
 Al Aarons, Bobby Bryant (tracks 1-3 & 6-8), Bobby Childers, Chuck Findley (track 5) - trumpet
 Britt Woodman, Frank Rosolino, George Bohannon – trombone
 Maurice Spears – bass trombone
Ernie Watts – alto saxophone, alto flute (tracks 1-3)
Jerome Richardson – alto flute (track 3)
Tyrone G. Kersey – organ, clavinet (tracks 1 & 3) 
Bobby Lyle – Fender Rhodes (tracks 2, 7 & 8)
Roland Chambers (tracks 1, 3 & 6), Bobby Eli (tracks 1, 3 & 5), Dennis Harris (tracks 1, 3, 5 & 6), Ray Parker Jr. (tracks 2, 7 & 8), Greg Porée (tracks 6 & 7) - electric guitar
Stanley Clarke (track 2), Scott G. Edwards (track 8), Michael "Sugie Bear" Foreman (tracks 3, 5 & 6) - bass 
Charles Collins (tracks 1, 3, 5 & 6), James Gadson (tracks 2, 7 & 8), Scott G. Edwards (track 7) - drums
Poncho Sanchez (tracks 2, 7 & 8), Larry Washington (tracks 1, 3 & 5) – congas 
Willie Bobo – rap, timbales, claves (track 8)
Mortonette Jenkins - vocals, backing vocals (tracks 2 & 5-7)
Ted Lange – rap (track 4)
Drake Frye – vocals (track 6)
Evette Benton (tracks 1 & 3), Carla Benson (tracks 1 & 3), Linda Evans (track 7), Brenda Lucille Gooch (tracks 2 & 5), Barbara Ingram (tracks 1 & 3), Jan Ellen Jones (tracks 2 & 5) - backing vocals
Bobby Martin – arranger (tracks 1 & 3)

References 

Columbia Records albums
Benny Golson albums
1977 albums